Monument Peak is a summit in the U.S. state of Nevada.

Monument Peak was named for the "monuments", i.e. stone prospectors' markers near it.

References

Mountains of Elko County, Nevada